Antago is a puzzle video game released in 1990 by Art of Dreams for the Amiga and Atari ST.

Further reading

External links
Antago at Atari Mania
Antago at Lemon Amiga

1990 video games
Amiga games
Atari ST games
Puzzle video games
Video games developed in France